Hifazat is a 1973 Indian Hindi-language drama film directed by K. S. R. Das. The film stars Ashok Kumar, Vinod Mehra, Asha Sachdev, Narendra Nath and Lalita Pawar. The film was not a commercial success but songs are classics even today.

Cast
Vinod Mehra as Kishore
Asha Sachdev as Asha
Ashok Kumar as Judge Ram Prasad - Asha's Foster Father (Special Appearance)
Madan Puri as Saw Mill Owner (Special Appearance)
Ranjeet as Ranjeet - Kishore's Friend (Special Appearance)
Kanhaiyalal as Kishore's Father
Iftekhar as Lala Jamnadas - Asha's Real Father (Special Appearance)
Lalita Pawar as Sewak Singh's Mother
Narendra Nath as Sewak Singh
Jyothi Lakshmi as Dancer

Soundtrack
All songs are written by Majrooh Sultanpuri and music by R. D. Burman.

External links
 

1973 films
1970s Hindi-language films
1973 drama films
Films directed by K. S. R. Das
Films scored by R. D. Burman